A gyron is a triangular heraldic ordinary having an angle at the fess point and the opposite side at the edge of the escutcheon.  A shield divided into gyrons is called gyronny, the default is typically of eight if no number of gyrons is specified.  The word gyron is derived from Old French giron, meaning 'gusset'. When a single gyron extends across so the tip touches the edge of the coat of arms, forming a square, it's called an esquire.

The gyron rarely appears singly, but as a variation of the field, gyronny coats appear frequently.  These most often appear as eight roughly equal parts, but occasionally a coat gyronny of six, ten, twelve or more parts may be specified.

References

Heraldic ordinaries